Sharif Nour (born 24 August 1963) is an Egyptian former swimmer. He competed in three events at the 1984 Summer Olympics.

References

External links
 

1963 births
Living people
Egyptian male swimmers
Olympic swimmers of Egypt
Swimmers at the 1984 Summer Olympics
Place of birth missing (living people)
20th-century Egyptian people
21st-century Egyptian people